Jet Lag is the fourth studio album by solo artist Milosh. It was released in November 2013 under Deadly Records, and produced by himself and his former wife Alexa Nikolas.

Track list

Personnel
Michael Milosh – composer
Charlie Cole – bass
Paul Pfisterer – guitar
Tim Shia – drums
João Carvalho – mastering
Matt de Jong – design

References

2013 albums